The Regional Psychiatric Centre is classified as a custodial forensic psychiatry facility (Federal Forensic Hospital) with multiple security levels with a staff of 345, it is located on a  parcel of land owned by the University of Saskatchewan and opened in 1978.  It is the only psychiatric hospital in the country with a therapeutic healing program designed for women offenders.

The centre is the only of its kind affiliated with a university medical school and accredited as a hospital; patients are admitted and discharged by medical staff with senior medical staff and faculty jointly appointed with the university providing for the development of treatment and research programs.  The centre is one of the residency training locations used by the Psychiatry Program at the University of Saskatchewan College of Medicine.

Major incidents 
 The Ashley Smith inquest examined a patient that was treated at the centre and moved back and forth with other institutions.

References in the media
 Karla (film)

References

External links 
 Correctional Service of Canada National Facility Directory
 University of Saskatchewan School of Medicine - Residency Program

Hospital buildings completed in 1978
Psychiatric hospitals in Canada
Hospitals in Saskatchewan
Teaching hospitals in Canada
Correctional Service of Canada institutions
Hospitals established in 1978
Buildings and structures in Saskatoon
Prisons in Saskatchewan
University of Saskatchewan
1978 establishments in Canada